The Bishop of Raphoe is an episcopal title which takes its name after the town of Raphoe in County Donegal, Ireland. In the Roman Catholic Church it remains a separate title, but in the Church of Ireland it has been united with another bishopric.

History
In the earliest period of the diocese, the episcopal see was often referred to as Tír Conaill (the surrounding region). It was also sometimes written as Ráith Both, the Middle Irish spelling of the location. In 1266, Bishop Germanus of Derry forcibly transferred the Inishowen peninsula from the jurisdiction of the Diocese of Raphoe to the Diocese of Derry.

After the Reformation, there were parallel episcopal successions. In the Church of Ireland, the title continued until 1834 when it united with Derry and formed the united bishopric of Derry and Raphoe.

In the Catholic Church, the title continues as a separate bishopric. The current Incumbent is The Most Reverend Alan McGuckian, S.J., Bishop of the Roman Catholic Diocese of Raphoe, who was appointed by the Holy See on 9 June 2017 and ordained Bishop on 6 August 2017.

Pre-Reformation

Reformation

Post-Reformation

Church of Ireland succession

Roman Catholic succession

Footnotes

Notes

References

 
 
 

 
History of Christianity in Ireland
Lists of Irish bishops and archbishops
Raphoe
Religion in County Donegal
Roman Catholic Diocese of Raphoe